Callum Frederick Jackson (born 7 September 1994) is an English professional cricketer who played most recently as a wicket-keeper for Kent County Cricket Club. Jackson made his first-class cricket debut for Sussex County Cricket Club in a three-day match against a touring Australian side in July 2013, having made his professional debut in Twenty20 matches earlier in the same month. He has represented England at under-19 level.

Early life and career
Born in Eastbourne, Jackson was educated at St Bede's School, Eastbourne. He made his way through the Sussex youth ranks, playing at under-13, under-14, under-15 and under-17 level before joining the second XI as a 16-year-old in 2011. He was selected to represent an English Schools Cricket Association XI in 2011 before making his first appearance for the Sussex first XI on 1 May 2012 in a non-first-class match against the Leeds/Bradford MCC Universities team.

In early 2013, Jackson was selected for the England under-19 side to tour South Africa, where he played in both Youth Test matches and three One Day Internationals in a five-match series, as well as in the two-innings warm-up match against a Western Cape Invitation XI.

Cricket career
With Sussex's first-choice wicket-keeper, Matt Prior, on England duty in the 2013 Ashes series and regular back-up Ben Brown injured with a broken finger, Jackson made his competitive debut for the club in a Friends Life t20 match against the Essex Eagles on 21 July 2013. Although he did not bat and Sussex lost by seven wickets, he made an impression by stumping Greg Smith, Hamish Rutherford and Ravi Bopara for Sussex's only wickets of the match. He appeared in a total of six limited overs matches for Sussex in 2013.

In December 2015, Jackson was released by Sussex due to financial cutbacks at the club after making one further appearance for the county in 2015.

In July 2016, he was registered to play for Kent as cover for Sam Billings and Adam Rouse after spells in both the Kent and Essex Second XIs. Jackson had appeared as a substitute fielder for Kent against Glamorgan in June following an injury to Rouse and made his County Championship debut in Kent's match against Essex at Chelmsford at the beginning of July. He signed a contract until the end of the season with Kent in mid-July, making his home debut for the club during Tunbridge Wells Cricket Week against his former county Sussex. He played in three first-class matches and one limited overs matches for Kent and was released at the end of the season.

References

External links

1994 births
Living people
Sportspeople from Eastbourne
English cricketers
Kent cricketers
Wicket-keepers